The Divine Feminine is the fourth studio album by American rapper Mac Miller. It was released on September 16, 2016, by REMember Music and Warner Bros. Records. The album features guest appearances from Kendrick Lamar, Anderson .Paak, Ty Dolla Sign, and Ariana Grande, among others.

The Divine Feminine was supported by three singles: "Dang!", "We", and "My Favorite Part". The album received generally positive reviews from critics and charted at number two on the US Billboard 200.

Background and meaning
Miller began working on The Divine Feminine immediately after completing his previous studio album GO:OD AM (2015), wanting to explore the emotion of love. He initially intended The Divine Feminine to be an EP, but changed it to a full-length album to allow himself to be more vulnerable. According to Miller, the album was not just about romantic love, but also about learning from women throughout his life and what those experiences meant to him. In May 2018, singer Ariana Grande, Miller's girlfriend at the time of the album's release, denied a claim that the entire album was about her, but said the track "Cinderella" was.

Release and promotion
The Divine Feminine was released worldwide by Warner Bros. Records on September 16, 2016. Miller performed the album on a concert special for Audience Network, which aired on September 30, 2016, and included guest appearances from Ariana Grande and CeeLo Green.

Miller announced The Divine Feminine Tour on August 24, 2016. The tour consisted of 43 shows across North America, beginning in Pittsburgh on September 18, 2016, and ending in Baltimore on December 18, 2016.

Singles
The album's first single, "Dang!", was released on July 28, 2016. The track features a guest appearance from American recording artist Anderson Paak, while the production was handled by Pomo. Its music video was released on August 2, 2016. Miller and Paak performed "Dang!" on The Late Show with Stephen Colbert on September 15, 2016.

The album's second single, "We", was released on August 19, 2016. The track features a guest appearance from American singer-songwriter CeeLo Green, while the production was handled by Frank Dukes.

The album's third single, "My Favorite Part", was released on September 9, 2016. The track features a guest appearance from American singer Ariana Grande, while the production was handled by MusicManTy. An accompanying music video was released on December 12, 2016.

Critical reception 

The Divine Feminine was met with generally positive reviews. At Metacritic, which assigns a normalized rating out of 100 to reviews from professional publications, the album received an average score of 70, based on nine reviews. Aggregator AnyDecentMusic? gave it 6.5 out of 10, based on their assessment of the critical consensus.

Andy Kellman of AllMusic said, "At all times, Miller and his associates are on the same page. Another aspect that makes this the rapper's most fulfilling album is that all the lines about being saved and in awe seem to be expressed with as much ease as the anatomical references, like they're plain facts, not wrenching confessions". Narsimha Chintaluri of HipHopDX said, "The listenability is at an all-time high, but the writing itself is still lackluster". Marshall Gu of PopMatters said, "Mac Miller isn't a good rapper, and he definitely can't carry a note, though he tries to do that a lot on this one. However, he has a vision of what he wanted this album to sound like and then carried it through with all the right producers and features, which is a talent in and of itself". Sheldon Pearce of Pitchfork said, "It's easily his most intoxicating release yet, an odyssey of soulful compositions paring down his expansive and eclectic soundboard from the last few years into something distinctly cozy and pleasant".

Scott Glaysher of XXL said, "All in all, The Divine Feminine is an experiment well done. Mac Miller's creative mind explores the ins and outs of the modern relationship while maintaining a certain level of sophistication that can be considered timeless". Kyle Eustice of Consequence said, "The album could offer some really tender moments, but because they're buried under lyrics that talk about nothing but sex, they're lost. Instead, The Divine Feminine leaves a sour taste behind and entirely misses an opportunity to truly honor the female gender". Ben Beaumont-Thomas of The Guardian said, "Few lyrics are particularly arresting (on "My Favorite Part", new girlfriend Ariana Grande is told that she doesn't know how beautiful she is) and there's some mid-album filler as Miller struggles to add hooks to cosmic G-funk". Keith Harris of Rolling Stone said, "Miller's grown-ass beats clash with his juvenile boasts, so he often ends up sounding like a well-meaning kid who can't stop putting his kicks up on the fancy furniture".

Complex placed The Divine Feminine at number 23 on their "50 Best Albums of 2016" year-end list. XXL ranked it among the best 50 hip hop projects of 2016.

Commercial performance
In the United States, The Divine Feminine debuted at number two on the Billboard 200, with 48,000 album-equivalent units, 32,000 of which were from traditional album sales.

The Divine Feminine earned 12,000 units in the week following Miller's death on September 7, 2018, allowing the album to re-enter the Billboard 200 at number 50.

Track listing 

Notes
 signifies a co-producer
 signifies an additional producer
 "Congratulations" features intro vocals by Ariana Grande, Kilo Kish, Chloe Clancy and Paige Montgomery
 "Stay" features additional vocals by Paige Montgomery
 "Skin" features additional vocals by Ella Paige and Njomza
 "We" features additional vocals by Thundercat
 "God is Fair, Sexy Nasty" features outro vocals by Nanny, Miller's grandmother

Samples
 "Stay" contains a sample of "Slowjizam" by Adam Feeney.
 "Soulmate" contains an audio clip from the 1997 film Good Will Hunting.
 "God is Fair, Sexy Nasty" contains a sample of "Come" by Zodiac (Jeremy Rose).

Personnel
Credits adapted from the album's liner notes.

Vocals

 Mac Miller – primary artist
 Bilal – featured artist (track 1)
 Anderson .Paak – featured artist (track 2)
 Ty Dolla Sign – featured artist (track 5)
 Njomza – featured artist (track 6), additional vocals (track 4)
 CeeLo Green – featured artist (track 8)
 Ariana Grande – featured artist (track 9), intro vocals (track 1)
 Kendrick Lamar – featured artist (track 10)
 Chloe Clancy – intro vocals (track 1)
 Kilo Kish – intro vocals (track 1)
 Paige Montgomery – intro vocals (track 1), additional vocals (track 3)
 Ella Paige – additional vocals (track 4)
 Thundercat – additional vocals (track 8)
 Nanny – outro vocals (track 10)

Instrumentation

 Drew Forde – strings (track 1)
 Lee Jeon – strings (track 1)
 Nathan Chan – strings (track 1)
 David Pimentel – bass, drums, keyboard (track 2)
 Braxton Cook – horn (track 2)
 Enrique Sanchez – horn (track 2)
 Jeffery Oliver – horn (track 2)
 Julian Lee – horn (track 2)
 Keyon Harrold – trumpet (track 3)
 Jeff Gitelman – bass, electric guitar (track 5)
 Sunni Colón – guitar (track 5)
 Joshua Valle – guitar (track 10)
 Robert Glasper – piano (track 10)

Production

 Mac Miller – executive production
 Aja Grant – production (tracks 1, 5), additional production (tracks 6, 10)
 Pomo – production (track 2)
 ID Labs – production (track 3)
 JMSN – production (track 4)
 DJ Dahi – production (track 5)
 Frank Dukes – production (tracks 6, 8)
 Vinylz – production (track 6)
 Dâm-Funk – production (track 7)
 MusicManTy – production (track 9)
 Tae Beast – production (track 10)
 MisterNeek – co-production (track 7)
 Garcia Bros. – additional production (track 4)
 Eric Dan – additional production (track 7)

Technical

 Derek Ali – mixing (all tracks)
 Chris Gehringer – mastering (all tracks)
 Brendan Silas Parry – engineering assistant (track 2)
 Derlis Chavarria – engineering assistant (tracks 3, 5–7)
 Sean Madden – engineering assistant (track 4)
 Nicholas Cavalieri – recording (tracks 1–2, 5, 7, 10)
 Zeke Mishanec – recording (track 2)
 Carlos Vives – recording (tracks 3, 5–7)
 Vic Wainstein – recording (tracks 4, 8–9), additional engineering (track 6)
 Kenta Yonesaka – recording (track 10)

Charts

Weekly charts

Year-end charts

Certifications

References

2016 albums
Mac Miller albums
Albums produced by Frank Dukes
Albums produced by Tae Beast
Warner Records albums